The LSWR 445 class was a class of express passenger 4-4-0 steam locomotives designed for the London and South Western Railway by William Adams. Twelve were constructed by Robert Stephenson and Company in 1883.

The class were numbered 445–456, and were an enlarged version of the 135 class. 

All were renumbered in to the duplicate list as 0445–0456 between 1908 and 1911.

All passed to the Southern Railway at the grouping in 1923. Withdrawals started in the same year, with four being retired in 1924, and the last seven were withdrawn in 1925. All were scrapped.

References 

445
4-4-0 locomotives
Robert Stephenson and Company locomotives
Railway locomotives introduced in 1883
Scrapped locomotives
Standard gauge steam locomotives of Great Britain